David Joshua Harrison (born August 15, 1982) is an American former professional basketball player. A former National Basketball Association (NBA) player for the Indiana Pacers, he was a member of the Beijing Ducks for the 2008–09 season and played with the Guangdong Southern Tigers for the next two years. He also played for the Tianjin Ronggang. At Brentwood Academy, Harrison received TSSAA Division 2 Mr. Basketball in 2000 and 2001. He was drafted by the Indiana Pacers out of the University of Colorado at Boulder with the 29th pick of the 2004 NBA Draft.

College career
In college, he was named First Team All-Big 12 and earned Honorable Mention All-America honors by the Associated Press as a junior. He finished his college career as Colorado's all-time leading shot-blocker with 225 blocks.

NBA career
Harrison was drafted 29th overall in the 2004 NBA Draft by the Indiana Pacers.  Harrison was expected to be the #2 or maybe even #3 center in the Pacers' depth chart for his rookie year of 2004–05, behind Jeff Foster and Scot Pollard. However, due to injuries to Pollard and the suspensions of Jermaine O'Neal, Stephen Jackson and Ron Artest, he became a starter at a much earlier part of his career than most people anticipated. He ended up starting 14 of the 43 games he played in his rookie season, before missing the final two months due to injury.

Harrison was charged with one count of assault and battery for his involvement in the Pacers–Pistons brawl at The Palace of Auburn Hills on November 19, 2004, though he was not penalized by the league for the incident.

In his sophomore season of 2005–06 with the Pacers, Harrison played in 67 games, starting 17 of them, playing an average of 15.4 minutes and contributing 5.7 points and 3.8 rebounds per game.

In 2008, the Pacers suspended Harrison for one game following an incident in which Harrison expressed his frustration inside the San Antonio Spurs' locker room after Spurs forward Matt Bonner hit him in the face (Bonner was called for an offensive foul). In Harrison's first game back from the suspension he had 4 points, 6 rebounds and a career high 6 blocks in just 20 minutes of play.

The Indiana Pacers chose not to re-sign Harrison after his contract expired at the end of the 2007–08 season. The Minnesota Timberwolves signed him to their practice squad for the preseason, but he was waived before the 2008–09 regular season began.

Off-court struggles
In an interview, Harrison admitted to smoking marijuana in the offseasons.  However, his habit carried into the regular season in 2007–2008, and because of this, he was suspended five games.  Since leaving the NBA, Harrison has struggled with financial issues.

Post-NBA career
After leaving the Indiana Pacers after the 2007–2008 season, Harrison played basketball in China for three seasons.  In the 2011–2012 season, he played for the NBA D-League team Reno Bighorns.  In 2012, he also played for the Dallas Mavericks summer league team.  After struggling with financial problems, Harrison took a job at McDonald's in August 2013.  However, he left his position after two weeks.  Currently, Harrison trades stocks in order to provide for his family.  Harrison also has a small mobile game application company, Kage Media Groups LLC, but he lacks the funding to make this a profitable means for him and his family.

Return to professional basketball
On September 14, 2015, Harrison decided to return to basketball and signed with the Las Vegas Dealers of the upcoming AmeriLeague. However, the league folded after it was discovered the founder was a con-artist.

Personal life
Harrison currently resides in Indianapolis with his girlfriend and infant son.

NBA career statistics

Regular season 

|-
| align="left" | 2004–05
| align="left" | Indiana
| 43 || 14 || 17.7 || .576 || .000 || .571 || 3.1 || .3 || .4 || 1.3 || 6.1
|-
| align="left" | 2005–06
| align="left" | Indiana
| 67 || 17 || 15.4 || .503 || .000 || .511 || 3.8 || .2 || .3 || .9 || 5.7
|-
| align="left" | 2006–07
| align="left" | Indiana
| 24 || 2 || 7.9 || .517 || .000 || .500 || 1.8 || .3 || .2 || .5 || 3.0
|-
| align="left" | 2007–08
| align="left" | Indiana
| 55 || 0 || 12.8 || .529 || .000 || .510 || 2.1 || .3 || .4 || 1.1 || 4.2
|- class="sortbottom"
| style="text-align:center;" colspan="2"| Career
| 189 || 33 || 14.2 || .530 || .000 || .525 || 2.9 || .2 || .3 || 1.0 || 5.0

Playoffs 

|-
| align="left" | 2006
| align="left" | Indiana
| 6 || 0 || 5.2 || .333 || .000 || .583 || .8 || .0 || .2 || .2 || 2.2
|- class="sortbottom"
| style="text-align:center;" colspan="2"| Career
| 6 || 0 || 5.2 || .333 || .000 || .583 || .8 || .0 || .2 || .2 || 2.2

CBA career statistics 

|-
| align="left" | 2008–09
| align="left" | Beijing
| 45 || N/A ||  42.3 || .632 || .000 || .578 || 11.2 || 1.2 || 1.3  || 2.4  || 22.0
|-
| align="left" | 2009–10
| align="left" | Guangdong
| 41 || N/A || 26.3 || .705 || .000 || .532 || 8.8 || .7 || .6 || 1.2 || 16.7
|-
| align="left" | 2010–11
| align="left" | Guangdong
|   ||   ||   ||   ||   ||   ||   ||   || ||   ||  
|-
| align="left" | Career
| align="left" | 
|  ||  || ||  ||  ||  || ||  ||  ||  ||

References

External links
David Harrison at NBA.com

1982 births
Living people
African-American basketball players
American expatriate basketball people in China
American men's basketball players
Basketball players from Nashville, Tennessee
Beijing Ducks players
Centers (basketball)
Colorado Buffaloes men's basketball players
Guangdong Southern Tigers players
Indiana Pacers draft picks
Indiana Pacers players
McDonald's High School All-Americans
Parade High School All-Americans (boys' basketball)
Reno Bighorns players
Tianjin Pioneers players
21st-century African-American sportspeople
20th-century African-American people